George Savage was a Scottish amateur footballer who played as a right back in the Scottish League for Queen's Park and Third Lanark. He was capped by Scotland at amateur level and later played in Canada.

Honours 
Montreal Canadian Alouettes

 Carling Cup: 1959

References 

Scottish footballers
Scottish Football League players
Queen's Park F.C. players
Association football defenders
Scotland amateur international footballers
Third Lanark A.C. players
Year of birth missing
Place of birth missing
Montreal Concordia players
Scottish expatriate sportspeople in Canada
Scottish expatriate footballers
Expatriate soccer players in Canada
Canadian National Soccer League players

People educated at St Mungo's Academy